The Octagon Barn, Otter Township is a historic building located near Milo in rural Warren County, Iowa, United States. It was built in 1900 as a horse and dairy barn. The octagon-shaped building measures  in diameter. The structure features a tall center section with a winged shed around it. It is covered in red horizontal siding and is topped by a sectional conical roof. It has been listed on the National Register of Historic Places since 1986.

References

Infrastructure completed in 1900
Buildings and structures in Warren County, Iowa
Barns on the National Register of Historic Places in Iowa
Octagon barns in the United States
National Register of Historic Places in Warren County, Iowa